Mary Church Terrell (born Mary Eliza Church; September 23, 1863 – July 24, 1954) was one of the first African-American women to earn a college degree, and became known as a national activist for civil rights and suffrage. She taught in the Latin Department at the M Street School (now known as Paul Laurence Dunbar High School)—the first African American public high school in the nation—in Washington, DC. In 1895, she was the first African-American woman in the United States to be appointed to the school board of a major city, serving in the District of Columbia until 1906. Terrell was a charter member of the National Association for the Advancement of Colored People (1909) and the Colored Women's League of Washington (1892). She helped found the National Association of Colored Women (1896) and served as its first national president, and she was a founding member of the National Association of College Women (1923).

Early life and education 

Mary "Mollie" Eliza Church was born in the year of 1863 in Memphis, Tennessee, to Robert Reed Church and Louisa Ayres, both freed slaves of mixed racial ancestry. Her parents were prominent members of the black elite of Memphis after the Civil War, during the Reconstruction Era. Her father was a businessman who became one of the first African American millionaires in the southern states and her mother was a hair stylist who owned her own hair salon. Her paternal great-grandmother was of mixed descent and her paternal grandfather was Captain Charles B. Church, a white steamship owner and operator from Virginia. After working for wages as a steward on his father's ship, the younger Church continued to accumulate wealth by investing in real estate, and purchased his first property in Memphis in 1866. He made his fortune by buying property after the city was depopulated following the 1878 yellow fever epidemic. He is considered to be the first African-American millionaire in the South.

Terrell's mother, Louisa Ayres, is believed to be one of the first African American women to establish and maintain a hair salon, frequented by well-to-do residents of Memphis. Ayres was a successful entrepreneur at a time when most women did not own businesses. She is credited with having encouraged her daughter to attend Antioch College Model School in Yellow Springs, Ohio, for elementary and secondary education, because the Memphis schools were not adequate.

Mary attended Antioch College Model School from 1871 to 1874, starting at the age of eight. In 1875, Mary’s parents moved her to Oberlin, Ohio to attend Oberlin public school from eight grade to the end of her high school education in 1879. Terrell remained in Oberlin throughout her college career, opting to take the four-year “gentleman’s course” instead of the expected two-year ladies’ course, earning her B.A. in 1884 and her M.A. in 1888.

Mary Church Terrell's father was married three times. His first marriage, to Margaret Pico Church, began in 1857, ended in 1862, and produced one child, Laura. Robert then married Louisa Ayers in 1862. Mary Church Terrell and her brother Thomas Ayres Church (1867–1937) were both products of this marriage, which ended in divorce. Their half-siblings, Robert, Jr. (1885–1952) and Annette (1887–1975), were born to Robert Sr.'s third wife, Anna Wright.

Terrell majored in Classics at Oberlin College, the first college in the United States to accept African American and female students. She was one of the first African American women to graduate with a Bachelor’s degree, rather than a 2-year ladies’ degree. The freshman class nominated her as class poet, and she was elected to two of the college's literary societies. She also served as an editor of The Oberlin Review. Terrell earned her bachelor's degree in 1884. She earned her degree in classics on the "gentleman's path", which was a full four years of study as opposed to the usual two years for women; she wrote that some of her friends tried to dissuade her from taking this degree, which included the study of Greek, on the grounds that "Greek was hard...it was unnecessary, if not positively unwomanly, for girls to study that 'old, dead language' anyhow...where...will you find a colored man who has studied Greek?". She graduated alongside notable African-American intellectuals Anna Julia Cooper and Ida Gibbs Hunt. Together, these three Oberlin graduates grew to become lifelong colleagues and highly regarded activists in the movement towards racial and gender equality in the United States. Continuing her studies at Oberlin, Terrell earned her master's degree in Education four years later, in 1888, becoming (along with Anna Julia Cooper) one of the first two black women to earn an MA.

Career 

Terrell began her career in education in 1885, teaching modern languages at Wilberforce University, a historically black college founded collaboratively by the Methodist Church in Ohio and the African Methodist Episcopal Church in the state. After 2 years of teaching in Ohio, Mary moved to Washington, D.C. to accept a position in the Latin Department at the M Street School. She took a leave of absence from teaching in 1888 to travel and study in Europe for two years, where she became fluent in French, German, and Italian. Eventually, Oberlin College offered her a registrarship position in 1891 which would make her the first black women to obtain such position; however, she declined. When she married Robert "Berto" Heberton Terrell in 1891 she was forced to resign from her position at the M Street School where her new husband also taught. In 1895 she was appointed superintendent of the M Street High School, becoming the first woman to hold this post.

Upon returning to the United States, Terrell shifted her attention from teaching to social activism, focusing especially on the empowerment of black women. She also wrote prolifically, including an autobiography, and her writing was published in several journals. "Lynching from a Negro's Point of View," published in 1904, is included in Terrell's long list of published work where she attempts to dismantle the skewed narrative of why black men are targeted for lynching and she presents numerous facts to support her claims.

Terrell's, autobiography, A Colored Woman in a White World (1940), accounts her personal experiences with racism.

Activism

Black women's clubs and the National Association of Colored Women 

In 1892, Terrell along with Helen Appo Cook, Ida B. Wells-Barnett, Anna Julie Cooper, Charlotte Forten Grimké, Mary Jane Patterson and Evelyn Shaw formed the Colored Women's League in Washington, D.C. The goals of the service-oriented club were to promote unity, social progress and the best interests of the African American community. Cook was elected president. The Colored Women's League aided in elevating the lives of educated Black women. It also started a training program and kindergarten, before these were included in the Washington, DC public schools.  Combined with her achievements as a principal, the success of the League's educational initiatives led to Terrell's appointment to the District of Columbia Board of Education which she held from 1895 to 1906. She was the first Black woman in the United States to hold such a position.

Around the same time, another group of progressive black women were gathering in Boston, Massachusetts under the direction of suffragist and intellectual Josephine St. Pierre Ruffin under the name Federation of Afro-American Women. As both organizations had similar ambitions and audiences, they combined their efforts with hundreds of other organizations to reach a wider focus of black women workers, students and activists nearing the beginning of the 20th century. Out of this union formed the National Association of Colored Women, which became the first secular national organization dedicated to the livelihoods of black women in America. The NACW's motto is "Lifting as we climb." and they aimed to create solidarity among black women while combating racial discrimination. Among other initiatives, members created day nurseries and kindergartens for black children. Terrell was twice elected president, serving from 1896 to 1901. After declining a third re-election, she was named honorary president of the Association.

In 1910, Terrell founded the College Alumnae Club, which later became the National Association of University Women (NAUW). The League started a training program and kindergarten before these were included in the Washington, DC public school system.

Fighting for black women's suffrage 
Having been an avid suffragist during her years as an Oberlin student, Terrell continued to be active in the happenings within suffragist circles in the National American Woman Suffrage Association. Through these meetings she became associated with Susan B. Anthony, an association which Terrell describes in her biography as "delightful, helpful friendship", which lasted until Anthony's death in 1906. Terrell also came to know  Elizabeth Cady Stanton in 1893, around the same time she met Susan B. Anthony. What grew out of Terrell's association with NAWSA was a desire to create a formal organizing group among black women in America to tackle issues of lynching, the disenfranchisement of the race, and the development of educational reform. As one of the few African-American women who was allowed to attend NAWSA's meetings, Terrell spoke directly about the injustices and issues within the African-American community.

On February 18, 1898, Terrell gave an address titled "The Progress of Colored Women" at the National American Woman Suffrage Association biennial session in Washington, D.C. This speech was a call of action for NAWSA to fight for the lives of black women. It was also during this session that Terrell addressed the "double burden" African American women were facing. Terrell believed that, when compared to white women, African American women has to overcome not only their sex, but race as well. The speech received great reception from the Association and black news outlets, ultimately leading Terrell to be invited back as an unofficial (black) ambassador for the Association. Though many black women were concerned and involved in the fight for American women's right to vote, the NAWSA did not allow black women to create their own chapter within the organization. Terrell went on to give more addresses, such as "In Union There is Strength", which discussed the need for unity among black people, and "What it Means to be Colored in the Capital of the U.S.", in which she discussed her own personal struggles that she faced as an African American woman in Washington, D.C. Terrell also addressed the Seneca Falls Historical Society in 1908 and praised the work of woman suffragists who were fighting for all races and genders alongside their primary causes.

In A Colored Woman In A White World, Terrell recalls how she was able to navigate her college years at the predominantly white-attended Oberlin with a sense of ease due to her racial ambiguity. She never passed as white at Oberlin, which was founded by abolitionists and accepted both white and black students even before the Civil War. In fact, her gender made her stand out more in her predominantly male classes. In subsequent years, it can be noted that she understood her mobility as a white-passing African-American woman as necessary to creating greater links between African-Americans and white Americans, thus leading her to become an active voice in NAWSA.

In 1913, Alice Paul organized a NAWSA suffrage rally where she initially planned to exclude black suffragists and later relegated them to the back of the parade in order to curry favor with Southern white women. However, Terrell and Ida B. Wells fought to integrate the march. Terrell marched with the delegation from new York City, while the Delta Sigma Theta sorority women of Howard University, whom Terrell mentored, marched with the other college women.

Active in the Republican Party, she was appointed director of Work among Colored Women of the East by the Republican National Committee for Warren G. Harding's 1920 presidential campaign during the first election in which American women won the right to vote. The Southern states from 1890 to 1908 passed voter registration and election laws that disenfranchised African-Americans of their right to vote. These restrictions were not fully overturned until after Congressional passage of the Voting Rights Act of 1965.

Integration 
Historians have generally emphasized Terrell's role as a community leader and civil rights and women's rights activist during the Progressive Era. She learned about women's rights while at Oberlin, where she became familiar with Susan B. Anthony's activism.

She also had a prolific career as a journalist (she identified as a writer). In the 1880s and 1890s she sometimes used the pen name Euphemia Kirk to publish in both the black and white press promoting the African American Women's Club Movement. She wrote for a variety of newspapers "published either by or in the interest of colored people," such as the A.M.E. Church Review of Philadelphia, Pennsylvania; the Southern Workman of Hampton, Virginia; the Indianapolis Freeman; the Afro-American of Baltimore; the Washington Tribune; the Chicago Defender; the New York Age; the Voice of the Negro; the Women's World; the North American Review and the Norfolk Journal and Guide. She also contributed to the Washington Evening Star and the Washington Post.

Terrell aligned the African-American Women's Club Movement with the broader struggle of black women and black people for equality. In 1892, she was elected as the first woman president of the prominent Washington DC black debate organization Bethel Literary and Historical Society

Through family connections and social networking, Terrell met many influential black activists of her day, including Booker T. Washington, director of the influential Tuskegee Institute in Alabama. At the age of 17, when she was enrolled at Oberlin, her father introduced her to activist Frederick Douglass at President James Garfield's inaugural gala. She became especially close with Douglass and worked with him on several civil rights campaigns. One of these campaigns includes a petition both Terrell and Douglass signed, in 1893, in hopes of a hearing of statement regarding lawless cases where black individuals in certain states were not receiving due process of law. Shortly after her marriage to Robert Terrell, she considered retiring from activism to focus on family life. Douglass, making the case that her talent was too immense to go unused, persuaded her to stay in public life.

In 1904, Terrell was invited to speak at the International Congress of Women, held in Berlin, Germany. She was the only black woman at the conference. She received an enthusiastic ovation when she honored the host nation by delivering her address in German. She delivered the speech in French, and concluded with the English version.

In 1909, Terrell was one of two black women (journalist Ida B. Wells-Barnett was the other) invited to sign the "Call" and to attend the first organizational meeting of the National Association for the Advancement of Colored People (NAACP), becoming a founding member. In 1913–14, she helped organize the Delta Sigma Theta sorority.  She helped write its oath and became an honorary member.

In World War I, Terrell was involved with the War Camp Community Service, which supported recreation for servicemen. Later it aided in issues related to the demobilization of black servicemen. Terrell was a delegate to the International Peace Conference after the end of the war. While in England, she stayed with H. G. Wells and his wife at their invitation.

Terrell worked actively in the women's suffrage movement, which pushed for enactment of the Nineteenth Amendment to the United States Constitution. Though Terrell died in 1954, her legacy and early fight for black women to vote continues to be cited. As the war was winding down, Terrell and her daughter Phyllis joined Alice Paul and Lucy Burns, of the National Women's Party, to picket the White House for women's suffrage.

Terrell was instrumental in integrating the American Association of University Women. From 1905 to 1910, she had actually been a member of that organization's Washington, D.C. chapter as an Oberlin graduate. However, she let her membership lapse due to growing involvement in other civic commitments. By the time she sought reinstatement in 1946, the chapter had become all-white and refused her application. Terrell appealed the matter to the national office which affirmed her eligibility, but the D.C. chapter changed its rules to make membership contingent on approval from its board of directors. After the chapter refused to amend its bylaws, the AAUW's national office filed a lawsuit in federal district court on Terrell's behalf, but lost the case.  This led to the overwhelming passage at the organization's 1949 convention of an anti-discrimination requirement. Incidentally, a number of the Washington, D.C. chapter's white members subsequently resigned in protest and formed their own organization, the University Women's Club of Washington. In 1948 Terrell won the anti-discrimination lawsuit (against the AAUW) and regained her membership, becoming the first black member after the exclusion of people of color within the DC chapter.

In 1950, Terrell started what would be a successful fight to integrate eating places in the District of Columbia. In the 1890s the District of Columbia had formalized segregation, as did states in the South. Before then, local integration laws dating to the 1870s had required all eating-place proprietors "to serve any respectable, well-behaved person regardless of color, or face a $1,000 fine and forfeiture of their license." In 1949, Terrell and colleagues Clark F. King, Essie Thompson, and Arthur F. Elmer entered the segregated Thompson Restaurant. When refused service, they promptly filed a lawsuit. Attorney Ringgold Hart, representing Thompson, argued on April 1, 1950, that the District laws were unconstitutional, and later won the case against restaurant segregation. In the three years pending a decision in District of Columbia v. John R. Thompson Co., Terrell targeted other restaurants. Her tactics included boycotts, picketing, and sit-ins. Finally, on June 8, 1953, the court ruled that segregated eating places in Washington, DC, were unconstitutional. Terrell was a leader and spokesperson for the Coordinating Committee for the Enforcement of the District of Columbia Anti-Discrimmination Laws which gave her the platform to lead this case successfully.

After the age of 80, Terrell continued to participate in picket lines, protesting the segregation of restaurants and theaters. During her senior years, she also succeeded in persuading the local chapter of the American Association of University Women to admit black members.

She lived to see the Supreme Court's decision in Brown v. Board of Education, holding unconstitutional the racial segregation of public schools. Terrell died two months later at the age of 90, on July 24, 1954, in Anne Arundel General Hospital in Highland Beach, Maryland. It was the week before the NACW was to hold its annual meeting in Annapolis, Maryland near her home in Highland Beech.

Legacy and honors 

 1933 – At Oberlin College's centennial celebration, Terrell was recognized among the college's "Top 100 Outstanding Alumni".
 1948 – Oberlin awarded Terrell the honorary Doctorate of Humane Letters.
 1954 – First Lady Mamie Eisenhower paid tribute to Terrell's memory in a letter read to the NACW convention on August 1, writing: "For more than 60 years, her great gifts were dedicated to the betterment of humanity, and she left a truly inspiring record."
 1975 – The Mary Church Terrell house in the LeDroit Park neighborhood of Washington was named a National Historic Landmark.
 Mary Church Terrell Elementary School at 3301 Wheeler Road, SE in Washington, DC was named in her honor, closed in 2013.
 2002 – Scholar Molefi Kete Asante included Mary Church Terrell on his list of 100 Greatest African Americans.
 2009 – Terrell was among 12 pioneers of civil rights commemorated in a United States Postal Service postage stamp series.
 A school in Gert Town, New Orleans was named Mary Church Terrell Elementary School. It was severely damaged in Hurricane Katrina, closed in 2008, and demolished in 2012.
 2018 – Oberlin College named its main library the Mary Church Terrell Main Library.
 2020 – Terrell was inducted into the National Women's Hall of Fame.

Marriage and children 
On October 18, 1891, in Memphis, Church married Robert Heberton Terrell, a lawyer who became the first black municipal court judge in Washington, DC. The couple first met in Washington, DC, when Robert visited the home of Dr. John Francis, where Mary was living. Soon after meeting, Francis offered Mary the opportunity to teach at the M Street High School, in the Greek and Latin Department, which Robert was the head of.

Prior to being engaged in a committed relationship, both Mary and Robert showed interest in pursuing others as romantic partners. Documentation from Mary's diary and letters that she wrote in both French and German in order to practice her language proficiency contain proof of correspondence with other men besides Robert. In Robert's courting letters to Mary, he mentions other women as well, though it is undetermined whether he mentioned them to make Mary jealous or for other reasons. 

However, once Mary returned from her travel in Europe, she returned to her work at the M Street High School where she rekindled her romance with Robert. While she had been away, Robert became a lawyer, though it is speculated that he regretted leaving his teacher job but he wanted to have an income in which he could afford to propose to Mary and support their life together. 

As a couple, Mary and Robert ran in many academic circles; Robert was a leader in the Washington D.C NAACP Chapter, and a part of the Music, Social, and Literary Club. 

Terrell experienced a late-term miscarriage, still-birth, and had one baby who died just after birth before their daughter Phyllis Terrell was born in 1898. She was named after Phillis Wheatley. The Terrells later adopted her niece, Mary.

Mary's miscarriage had lasting effects on her marriage to Robert; she suffered long-term health complications which sent her into a deep depression. Prior to her miscarriage, she had learned of her friend Thomas' lynching, and not long after learning of his death and losing her child, she began to suffer physically and mentally. Eventually, Terrell began to focus on anti-lynching activism and spoke publicly about black women's health, utilizing her past trauma and experiences to inform her message.

Works 
 "Duty of the National Association of Colored Women to the Race", A. M. E. Church Review (January 1900), 340–354.
 "Club Work of Colored Women", Southern Workman, August 8, 1901, 435–438.
 "Society Among the Colored People of Washington", Voice of the Negro (April 1904), 150–156.
 
 "The Washington Conservatory of Music for Colored People", Voice of the Negro (November 1904), 525–530.
 "Purity and the Negro", Light (June 1905), 19–25.
 "Paul Laurence Dunbar", Voice of the Negro (April 1906), 271–277.
 "Susan B. Anthony, the Abolitionist", Voice of the Negro (June 1906), 411–416.
 "A Plea for the White South by a Colored Woman", Nineteenth Century (July 1906), 70–84.
 "What It Means to Be Colored in the Capital of the United States", Independent, October 10, 1906, 181–186.
 "An Interview with W. T. Stead on the Race Problem", Voice of the Negro (July 1907), 327–330
 "Peonage in the United States: The Convict Lease System and the Chain Gangs", Nineteenth Century 62 (August 1907), 306–322.
  (see Phyllis Wheatley.)
 A Colored Woman in a White World (1940), autobiography.
 "I Remember Frederick Douglass", Ebony (1953), 73–80.

See also

 Black suffrage in the United States

Footnotes

Further reading 
 Church, M. T.(1940). A Colored Woman in a White World. Washington, DC: Ransdell, Inc. Publishers.
 Cooper, Brittney C. (2017). Beyond Respectability: The Intellectual Thought of Race Women. Urbana, IL: University of Illinois Press.
 Davis, E. L. (1996). Lifting as They Climb. New York: G.K. Hall & Co.
 Johnson, K. A. (2000). Uplifting the Women and the Race: The Educational Philosophies and Social Activism of Anna Julia Cooper and Nannie Helen Burroughs, New York: Garland Publishing.
 
 Jones, B. W. (1990). Quest for Equality: The Life and Writings of Mary Eliza Church Terrell. Brooklyn, New York: Carlson Publishing, Inc.
 Margaret Nash, Patient Persistence: The Political and Educational Values of Anna Julia Cooper and Mary Church Terrell. University of California at Riverside.
 Parker, Alison M. (2020). Unceasing Militant: The Life of Mary Church Terrell. UNC Press. .
 Parker, Alison M. (2020). "Mary Church Terrell: Black Suffragist and Civil Rights Activist." National Park Service. Mary Church Terrell: Black Suffragist and Civil Rights Activist (U.S. National Park Service)
 Sterling, Dorothy. (1988). Black Foremothers: Three Lives. New York: The Feminist Press, 119–148.
 Terborg-Penn, R. (1998). African American Women in the Struggle for the Vote. Bloomington, Indiana: Indiana University Press.
 Wade-Gayles, G. "Black Women Journalists in the South: 1880–1905: An Approach to the Study of Black Women's History", Callaloo, 11, 138–152.
 Washington Post. "Restaurant's Right to Bar Negroes Upheld."
 Washington Post. "Assails Mrs. Terrell". June 19, 1904.
 "Mary Church Terrell", American Memory, Library of Congress
 "Mary Church Terrell (1863–1954)", Digital Library, Tennessee State University
 "Mary Eliza Church Terrell", Afro-American History
 This article is based in part on a document created by the National Park Service, which is part of the US Government. As such, it is presumed to be in the public domain.

External links 

 "Civil Rights Activist Mary Church Terrell." C-Span.
 
 
 
 The story of her life is retold in the radio drama "The Long Road", a presentation from Destination Freedom

1863 births
1954 deaths
Activists for African-American civil rights
Oberlin College alumni
People from Memphis, Tennessee
People from Yellow Springs, Ohio
African-American suffragists
African-American women writers
African-American writers
American writers
Maryland Republicans
American suffragists
Washington, D.C., Republicans
Delta Sigma Theta members
Members of the District of Columbia Board of Education
Activists from Ohio
Presidents of the National Association of Colored Women's Clubs
American people of Malagasy descent
International Congress of Women people
Women civil rights activists
20th-century African-American people
20th-century African-American women